MacArthur High School is a public high school in Irving, Texas. Opened in 1963, it is named for the American General of the Army Douglas MacArthur. In 2010, the school was rated "Academically Recognized" by the Texas Education Agency.

History

MacArthur High School, named after Douglas MacArthur, opened in 1963. A Junior ROTC program began in the 1973–4 school year.

Controversies

Student arrest controversy

A 14-year-old student, Ahmed Mohamed, was arrested on September 14, 2015, for bringing an alleged hoax bomb to school. The episode arose when Mohamed reassembled the parts of a digital clock in an  pencil container, and brought it to school to show his teachers.

Anti LGBTQ+ policies
Shortly after the start of the 2021-2022 year, word spread among students that the new principal, Ms. Stewart, had allegedly fired a teacher for being openly gay and was forcing teachers to remove "safe space" stickers. This controversy quickly created a fervor among students which emboldened them to organize a walkout for LGBTQ+ rights, occurring on September 22 between 6th and 7th period. On September 23 of 2021, the principal was alleged to have made a response to the student body telling them to comply with whatever actions she takes even if they are controversial, and that she may have been encouraged by higher ups at the education board to promote anti-LGBTQ+ policies.

Academic ratings
In 2009, the school was rated "Academically Acceptable" by the Texas Education Agency. In 2010, the school was rated "Academically Recognized" by the Texas Education Agency.

Sports
In 2011, the MacArthur girls basketball team won the state tournament. Coach Suzie Oelschlegel was named the Coach of the Year by the National Federation of State High School Associations.

Notable people

Alumni
Peter MacNicol, Emmy Award-winning actor
Kole Ayi, professional football player
Akin Ayodele, professional football player
Brian Bosworth, professional football player and actor
Ron Brooks, professional football player
Patrick Chukwurah, professional football player
Mike Phillips, professional baseball player
Steve Railsback, actor
Odyssey Sims, professional basketball player
Alexis Jones, professional basketball player
Andrew Jones, college basketball player

Faculty
David Beaty, football coach, 2002-05
Phil Bennett, football coach, 1983
Melvin Robertson, football coach, 1988-1990

Others
James 'Tommy' Exum, video stuff

References

External links
 
 MacArthur High School Homepage (Archive)

1963 establishments in Texas
Educational institutions established in 1963
High schools in Irving, Texas
Irving Independent School District high schools